Aletta is a Dutch feminine given name, related to Alida, Adelheid and Adelaide. Alette is a variant form that is also used in Norway. People with the name include:

Aletta
Aletta de Frey (1768–1808), Dutch copyist, drawer and painter
Aletta Hannemans (1606–1653),  Dutch brewer portrayed by Frans Hals
Aletta Jacobs (1854–1929), Dutch physician and women's suffrage activist
Aletta Jorritsma (born 1989), Dutch rower
Aletta van Manen (born 1958), Dutch hockey player
Aletta Norval (born 1960), South African political theorist
Cornelia Aletta van Hulst (1797–1870), Dutch painter
Maria Aletta Hulshoff (1781–1846), Dutch Patriot, feminist and pamphleteer
Alette
Alette Coble-Temple, American psychologist 
Alette Due (1812–1887), Norwegian singer and composer
Alette Engelhart (1896–1984), Norwegian housewives' leader
Alette Pos (born 1962), Dutch hockey player
Alette Schreiner (1873–1951), Norwegian researcher
Alette Sijbring (born 1982), Dutch water polo player
Marion Alette Bultman (born 1960), Dutch sailor

See also
1194 Aletta, asteroid, named after Maria Aletta Lessing Jackson, wife of the discoverer
Hurricane Aletta, the name of several tropical cyclones
SS Narva, originally called Aletta Noot

Feminine given names
Dutch feminine given names